Immigrés is an album by Senegalese singer and percussionist Youssou N'Dour. AllMusic remarks that the album is "a good part of what put [N'Dour] on the international map".

Critical reception

Though the album has been criticized for its use of synthesizers, it has been praised as a showcase for N'Dour's voice. Rolling Stone described the album as "wonderfully moving," and AllMusic terms it "almost a classic".

NME ranked it number 18 among the "Albums of the Year" for 1984, and it was included in the book 1001 Albums You Must Hear Before You Die.

Track listing
Except where noted, all tracks composed by Youssou N'Dour:

"Immigrés/Bitim Rew" – 7:03
"Pitche Mi" (Kabou Gueye) – 9:27
"Taaw" – 11:56
"Badou" – 5:35

Personnel

Youssou N'Dour – vocals
Le Super Etoile de Dakar
Rane Diallo – alto saxophone, vocals
Fefe Diambouana – tenor saxophone
Maguette Dieng – drums, timbales
Mbaye Dieye Faye – tumba, sabar
Kabou Gueye – bass guitar, double bass
Mamadou "Jimi" Mbaye – lead guitar
Ousseynou Ndiaye – vocals
Pape Oumar Ngom  – rhythm guitar
Alla Seck – vocals
Assane Thiam – tama
Benjamin Valfroy – keyboards

Production
Daniel Bujon – mixing
Jenny Cathcart – liner notes
John Dent – mastering
Youssou N'Dour – producer

References

1988 albums
Youssou N'Dour albums